Fatima Mereles (born 26 May 1953) is a botanist and academic from Paraguay, who specialises in wetland flora.

Biography 
María Fátima Mereles Haydar was born on 26 May 1953 in Asunción. She studied for an undergraduate degree in Biology at the National University of Asunción. She studied for a PhD at the University of Geneva and graduated in 1998. She is Director of the Department of Biology at National University of Asunción. In 2009 she became President of CONACYT, the National Council for Science and Technology in Paraguay. She is also Secretary General of UNESCO's Man & Biosphere National Committee for Paraguay.

Research 

Mereles' main area of research focuses on Spermatophytes. She specialises in the flora of wetland areas of Paraguay, such as the Cerrado and the Gran Chaco. She has published over one hundred articles, as well as naming four new plant species: Eleocharis canindeyuensis; Eleocharis grandirostris; Eleocharis grossimucronata; Eleocharis occidentalis.

Awards and honours

Honorary doctorate 
In 2020 Mereles was awarded an honorary doctorate by the Universidad Autónoma de Encarnación to recognise her achievements in "national and international scientific research and development".

Eponym 
The bromeliad Tillandsia mereliana is named after Mereles.

References

External links 
Conservation models with a view to development - Fatima Mereles - Green Economy

1953 births
Living people
Paraguayan botanists
Women botanists
Paraguayan women scientists
Botanists active in South America
University of Geneva alumni
Universidad Nacional de Asunción alumni
People from Asunción
20th-century botanists
20th-century women scientists
21st-century botanists
21st-century women scientists